The First 48 is an American documentary/news magazine television series on A&E filmed in various cities in the United States, offering an insider's look at the real-life world of homicide investigators. While the series often follows the investigations to their end, it usually focuses on their first 48 hours, hence the title.

Each episode picks one or more homicides in different cities, covering each alternately, showing how detectives use forensic evidence, witness interviews, and other advanced investigative techniques to identify suspects. While most cases are solved within the first 48 hours, some go on days, weeks, months or even years after the first 48.

The series was nominated for a Distinguished Documentary Achievement Award in the Continuing Series category by the International Documentary Association, eventually losing to PBS' American Experience. By season 6, The First 48 had become the highest-rated non-fiction justice series on television and has gained critical acclaim along with controversy. The season 8 episode, "Gone", which aired on January 1, 2009, garnered a domestic audience of 2.3 million viewers, becoming the series' most-watched episode at the time.

Title sequence
Until the 1st episode of the 12th season, the opening title sequence featured the conceptual statement "For homicide detectives, the clock starts ticking the moment they are called. Their chance of solving a murder is cut in half if they don't get a lead within the first 48 hours." The original soundtrack, opening title theme and dark ambient sound design for the overall program was composed by Chuck Hammer (2004–2006). Later composers included Brian and Justin Deming (2006–2008) and Paul Brill (2008–2018), who continued with a combination of dark ambient music integrated with sound design.

Episodes

Spin-offs

The series has several follow-up episodes entitled After the First 48—detailing the trials of those accused in previous episodes—and the aftermath of victims' survivors. The First 48: Missing Persons follows the same story format as the original series. The Killer Speaks depicts convicted felons as they describe their crimes through their first-hand accounts. The First 48 Presents Critical Minutes looks back at some of the most unforgettable moments in the series’ history. Hosted by former “First 48” detectives, each episode presents different cases previously featured on the show, all with a common theme such as “The Case That Haunts Me,” “Heat of the Moment,” “Shocking Confessions,” “Rookie Detectives,” “Women of Homicide,” and “Caught on Camera.”

Reception 
The First 48 has received generally positive reviews from television critics. Linda Stasi of New York Post called it, "Riveting." Ken Tucker of Yahoo! News wrote, "Addictive."

Controversy
On November 18, 2009, 21-year-old Taiwan Smart of Miami was charged with two counts of second-degree murder of his two roommates in Little Haiti. His story aired later as an episode titled "Inside Job." Evidence later established that police made important mistakes in their investigation. Additionally, The First 48 misrepresented a key witness' statement on the program. Smart was released in June 2011 and has since sued the city of Miami for false imprisonment. The episode, which originally aired on July 15, 2010, continues to air without correction. In 2014, the city of Miami announced that it would not be renewing its contract with A&E, ending the filming of any future episodes  of The First 48 there.

On May 16, 2010, 7-year-old Aiyana Jones of Detroit was shot and killed during a special weapons and tactics (SWAT) raid that was recorded by The First 48 cameras. Detroit SWAT units raided the duplex while searching for a homicide suspect. On October 5, 2011, prosecutors charged the Detroit police officer with the involuntary manslaughter of Jones. Allison Howard, an A&E Television Network camera operator filming that night, was charged with perjury and obstruction of justice after lying under oath. She pleaded no contest to obstruction of justice and was sentenced to two years of probation.

On December 16, 2015, Shawn Peterson pled guilty to manslaughter for the triple murder of his ex-girlfriend, Christine George, her son, Leonard and her daughter, Trisa in the Gentilly neighborhood of New Orleans. Peterson's defense attorneys argued that producers from The First 48 withheld video evidence that could have exonerated their client. A judge rejected the motion but conceded that the show did complicate the case. In 2016, the city of New Orleans announced that it would be ending its contract with A&E, ending any future productions of The First 48 or Nightwatch, another A&E show set in New Orleans.  On November 6, 2020, it was announced that filming for Nightwatch would resume filming in New Orleans after a three year hiatus but no such announcement was made for The First 48.

References

External links
 
 

2004 American television series debuts
Documentary television series about policing
A&E (TV network) original programming
English-language television shows
Television series by ITV Studios
American documentary television series about crime
2000s American documentary television series
2010s American documentary television series
2020s American documentary television series